Devario manipurensis is a freshwater fish endemic to  India.

References

Freshwater fish of India
Fish described in 1987
Devario